Moulay Rachid is an arrondissement and southeastern suburb of Casablanca, in the Moulay Rachid district of the Casablanca-Settat region of Morocco. As of 2004 it had 207,624 inhabitants.

References

Arrondissements of Casablanca